Władysław Ludwik Anczyc (12 December 1823, Vilnius – 28 July 1883) was a Polish poet, playwright, publisher, translator and folk activist.

References

External links

 
 

1823 births
1883 deaths
Writers from Vilnius
People from Vilensky Uyezd
19th-century Polish nobility
Polish male dramatists and playwrights
Polish publishers (people)
Polish translators
19th-century translators
19th-century Polish poets
19th-century Polish dramatists and playwrights
Polish male poets
19th-century Polish male writers
Jagiellonian University alumni
January Uprising participants
Burials at Rakowicki Cemetery